James Thacher (February 14, 1754 – May 26, 1844) was an American physician and writer, born in Barnstable, Massachusetts.

Biography
When Thacher was 16 he became an apprentice for Abner Hersey, a doctor from Barnstable, Massachusetts. From 1775 to 1783 he was a surgeon in the Revolution, in the Massachusetts 16th Regiment.  Afterward, he practiced in Plymouth, Massachusetts until his death. He was elected a Fellow of the American Academy of Arts and Sciences in 1803.

He was married to Susannah Hayward of Bridgewater, Massachusetts.  They had six children.  However, only two daughters lived into adulthood.

Thacher was stationed at West Point in 1780 and supported the execution by George Washington of the British spy John André.

Works
Military Journal during the American Revolutionary War (1823)
Observations Relative to the Execution of Major John André as a Spy in 1780 (1834)
American New Dispensatory (1810; fourth edition, 1821)
History of the town of Plymouth, from its first settlement in 1620, to the present time (1835)
An Essay on Demonology, Ghosts and Apparitions, and Popular Superstitions Also, an Account of the Witchcraft Delusion at Salem,  (1692)
Several other books.

See also
Kosciuszko's Garden

References

External links
The Online Books Page: James Thacher
 James Thacher correspondence, 1781-1842 (inclusive). B MS c1. Boston Medical Library, Francis A. Countway Library of Medicine, Boston, Mass.

18th-century American physicians
American political writers
American male non-fiction writers
American science writers
Physicians from Massachusetts
Fellows of the American Academy of Arts and Sciences
People from Barnstable, Massachusetts
1754 births
1844 deaths
Historians from Massachusetts
18th-century American male writers